Air: The Musical is an independent feature film directed by Jeremy Osbern and starring Ian Stark, Megan Carter, Granvile O'Neal, Brenda Harvey, Dylan Paul Hilpmann, and Jennifer Coville. The film received screenings in 2007 and 2008, and was officially released to DVD on 6 April 2010. AIR: The Musical was filmed and produced in Lawrence, Kansas between the years of 2004 and 2008.

Premise
The film follows six individuals, all of whom are struggling to find their place in the world.

Cast
 Ian Stark as Dan
 Megan Carter as Sarah
 Granvile O'Neal as Malcolm
 Brenda Harvey as Julie Anne
 Dylan Paul Hilpmann as Donnie
 Jennifer Coville as Kathy

Reception
The Newton Kansan wrote a favorable review for Air: The Musical, stating "Every Kansan needs to see this movie — if only to reinforce the idea there are talented people right here where we live."
The film was featured as the cover story of issue #58 of Indie Slate Magazine.

References

External links
 
 

2010 films
2010s English-language films
2010 independent films
American independent films
Films shot in Kansas
Films set in Kansas
2010s American films